Elena Arzak (born 4 July 1969) is a Basque chef. She is joint head chef of three Michelin starred restaurant Arzak alongside her father, Juan Mari Arzak, and was named best Female Chef in the World in 2012.

Biography
She first started working at her family's restaurant, Arzak, at the age of 11, becoming the fourth generation of her family to work there. She would work two hours a day during the summer holidays from school. At the time her grandmother was the head chef. Her father is Juan Mari Arzak, who initially worked under his mother at the restaurant, but went on to become head chef himself.

Her father sent her abroad to train at other restaurants after she attended hotel school in Lucerne in Switzerland. She worked at Le Gavroche in London for six months in 1989 under Albert Roux, and alongside Michel Roux Jr. who was also training at the time. She also trained at La Maison Troisgros, Le Louis XV under Alain Ducasse, Restaurant Pierre Gagnaire and returned to Spain when she worked at elBulli.

She became joint head chef of her family's restaurant alongside her father. In 2011, she appeared at The Restaurant Show in London, England. As well as conducting a cooking demonstration, she officially opened the show alongside Rachel Quigley. She has ruled out opening a second restaurant for the time being, but said "I won't say never".

In June 2020, she and other chefs, as well as architects, Nobel laureates in Economics and leaders of international organizations, signed the appeal in favour of the purple economy (“Towards a cultural renaissance of the economy”), published in Corriere della Sera, El País and Le Monde.

Awards
In 2011, she was nominated for Restaurant's Veuve Clicquot award for World's Best Female Chef, but it was awarded to Anne-Sophie Pic. However, Arzak went on to win the award in 2012.

Personal life
She has two children, Nora and Mateo. Elena can speak four languages, including German.

References

External links

Living people
1969 births
People from San Sebastián
Spanish chefs
Women chefs
Head chefs of Michelin starred restaurants
Spanish expatriates in the United Kingdom
Spanish expatriates in France